Series 3 of Top Gear, a British motoring magazine and factual television programme, was broadcast in the United Kingdom on BBC Two during 2003, consisting of nine episodes between 26 October and 28 December; a compilation episode featuring the best moments of the series, titled "Best of Top Gear", was aired on 4 January 2004.

This series is notable for a feature in which the presenters tested the strength of the fourth generation Toyota Hilux by putting one through several destructive tests, including submerging it underwater and setting it on fire, to see if it is invincible. This series also saw the departure of Perry McCarthy's Black Stig, who was "killed off" in a stunt aboard  at the end of the first episode; Ben Collins' First White Stig was introduced as the new Stig in the second episode.

Episodes

Best-of Episodes

Criticism and Controversy

Hilux Toughness Challenge
Following the broadcast of the fifth episode of the 3rd series, the BBC was contacted by the Churchill Parish in Somerset in regards to the tree that featured in the segment where Clarkson was proving the sturdiness and reliability of the Toyota Hilux. Up until the episode had been broadcast, villagers had presumed that the damage had been done accidentally or by vandals, until they watched what had happened on the show. After the BBC was contacted, the director of Top Gear admitted guilt and the broadcaster paid compensation.

References

2003 British television seasons
Top Gear seasons